Sir Mir Saeed Zahedi,  (born 23 May 1957) is a British-Iranian biomedical engineer and innovator who is the Technical Director at Chas A Blatchford & Sons. He was named Royal Designer for Industry in 2014 and in 2016 he appeared on Debrett's 500 List which recognises Britain's 500 most influential individuals. He was knighted "for services to Engineering and Innovation" in 2017.

Early life and education 
Zahedi was born on 23 May 1957 in Tehran, Iran. He moved to the UK as a teenager to attend the London Academy. He studied mechanical engineering at the Polytechnic of Central London, graduating with a Bachelor of Science (BSc) degree. He undertook postgraduate studies in biomedical engineering at the University of Strathclyde. His doctoral thesis was titled "The study of alignment of lower limb prostheses" and was completed in 2007.

Career 
Having previously worked as a research assistant at the University of Strathclyde, Zahedi was employed as a medical physicist in charge of a prosthetic clinic in the National Health Service (NHS) during his early career. In 1988, Zahedi began working at Chas A Blatchford & Sons as a project manager. He later moved to become Head of Technology at PDD (Pankhurst Design and Development Group Ltd) in 1999.

In 2003, Zahedi returned to Chas A Blatchford & Sons in the research and development unit and was later appointed as Technical Director in 2006. He is a visiting professor at Bournemouth University's Design Simulation Research Centre and previously, the University of Surrey.

Zahedi led the team at Blatchford that developed the Linx, the first microprocessor-controlled lower limb prosthetic where the foot and knee continuously ‘talk’ to each other. With its combination of new materials, microprocessor controls and understanding of how people walk, Linx won the 2016 MacRobert Award. This system uses a network of sensors across the knee and foot to collect data on the user's activity which is subsequently used to adapt to the specific movements of the user and their respective environment. In August 2016, he answered questions in an AMA (Ask Me Anything) session on Reddit's IAmA subreddit.

Honours and awards 
Zahedi is author of over 125 publications related to prosthesis research and has patented over 35 inventions. In 2011 he was nominated for the Prince Philip Designers Prize for which he received a Special Commendation. In 2013 he received the Royal Designer for Industry (RDI) award for engineering design.

He and his team were finalists in the 2010 MacRobert Award for work on the Echelon hydraulic ankle-foot, the world's first self-aligning ankle-foot prosthesis. Along with four colleagues, Zahedi won the 2016 MacRobert Award for their development of Linx.

Zahedi is a member of ISO, CEN and IEC Working Groups. He has won 5 BLESMA awards, IMechE Special Needs, and ISPO Forchheimer in 1989, for his PhD work conducted at Strathclyde University.

In the 2000 New Year Honours, Zahedi was awarded an OBE for "services to the Prosthetics Industry". In 2017, during the ISPO World Congress in Cape Town, Zahedi delivered one of the three keynote speeches to the 2,000 participants.

Zahedi received a knighthood in the Queen's Birthday Honours 2017 "for services to Engineering and Innovation".

Personal life 
Zahedi married Shirin Zahedi (née Sadeghian) in 1988. The couple have two children. He resides in London.

References 

1957 births
Living people
Iranian bioengineers
Officers of the Order of the British Empire
Knights Bachelor
Iranian emigrants to the United Kingdom
British bioengineers
Alumni of the University of Westminster
Alumni of the University of Strathclyde